Pronemouridae is an extinct family of stoneflies in the order Plecoptera. There are at least three genera and about eight described species in Pronemouridae.

Genera
These three genera belong to the family Pronemouridae:
 † Dimoula Sinitshenkova, 2005
 † Nemourisca Sinitshenkova, 1987
 † Pronemoura Liu, Sinitshenkova & Ren, 2011

References

Plecoptera
Prehistoric insect families